Statistics of Ekstraklasa for the 1995–96 season.

Overview
18 teams competed in the 1995–96 season with Widzew Łódź winning the championship.

League table

Results

Top goalscorers

References

External links
 Poland – List of final tables at RSSSF 

Ekstraklasa seasons
1995–96 in Polish football
Pol